Partners of the Tide is a novel by Joseph C. Lincoln published in 1905. It was adapted into a 1921 film. The story revolves around a shipwreck. L. V. Jefferson is given directing credit in the catalog of copyrights.

Film

The film was an Irvin V. Willat production and the fourth film made at Willat Studios.

Cast
Jack Perrin
Marion Feducha 
Gordon Mullen
Daisy Jefferson
Gertrude Norman

References

1905 American novels
American novels adapted into films